Ctenolophus is a genus of African armored trapdoor spiders that was first described by William Frederick Purcell in 1904. Originally placed with the Ctenizidae, it was moved to the Idiopidae in 1985.

Species
 it contains 6 species, all found in South Africa:
Ctenolophus cregoei (Purcell, 1902) – South Africa
Ctenolophus fenoulheti Hewitt, 1913 – South Africa
Ctenolophus kolbei (Purcell, 1902) (type) – South Africa
Ctenolophus oomi Hewitt, 1913 – South Africa
Ctenolophus pectinipalpis (Purcell, 1903) – South Africa
Ctenolophus spiricola (Purcell, 1903) – South Africa

See also
 List of Idiopidae species

References

External links

Endemic fauna of South Africa
Idiopidae
Mygalomorphae genera
Spiders of South Africa
Taxa named by William Frederick Purcell